Jaka Jazbec is an Italian sprint canoer who has competed since the mid-2000s. He won a bronze medal in the K-4 500 m at the 2005 ICF Canoe Sprint World Championships in Zagreb.

References

Italian male canoeists
Living people
Year of birth missing (living people)
ICF Canoe Sprint World Championships medalists in kayak